Channel GMM 25 (simply GMM 25) is a Thai digital terrestrial television channel owned by GMM Grammy and operated by The One Enterprise. The network offers a variety of content such as drama, music, news and entertainment programs targeting teenagers.

It also airs some programs produced by GMMTV, including teen and Yaoi (also known as "Boys Love" or simply "BL") drama series daily evenings at 20:30 (8:30 pm), and weekend TV shows (mid-morning and late-night).

GMM 25 was launched on 25 May 2014 after GMM Grammy was awarded with a digital TV license from the National Broadcasting and Telecommunications Committee in December 2013.

The network has also partnered with Viu and Line TV in providing full re-runs of its programs.

The CEO of GMM25 is Takonkiet Viravan, who is also the Managing Director of The One Enterprise and One 31.

References

External links

Television stations in Thailand
GMM Grammy